XHVTH-FM is a radio station on 107.1 FM that serves the McAllen, Texas-Brownsville, Texas (USA) / Reynosa-Matamoros, Tamaulipas (Mexico) border area. It broadcasts from the Multimedios Radio tower at El Control, Tamaulipas.

History
XHVTH received its concession on October 17, 1990, a month after signing on air. It has always been owned by Multimedios.

External links
 mmradio.com
 raiostationworld.com; Radio stations in the Rio Grande Valley

References

1990 establishments in Mexico
Multimedios Radio
Radio stations in Matamoros, Tamaulipas
Spanish-language radio stations